Harchand Singh (born 6 May 1916) was an Indian politician and belonged to Indian National Congress.He was elected to the Lok Sabha, lower house of the Parliament of India from Ropar in Punjab.

References

External links
Profile on Lok Sabha website

1916 births
Possibly living people
India MPs 1991–1996
Lok Sabha members from Punjab, India